Pampady is a fast growing town in  Kottayam district of Kerala, Southern India. It lies midway between the backwaters of Western Kerala and the mountains of the Western Ghats.

Etymology
The meaning of Pampady as per Malayalam Dictionary - "Sabdatharavaly" of Sreekandeswaram - is "Ananthasayanan". (The Land of Lord Vishnu). The area where there was a Sreekrishna Temple by Valiyamadom Potty was called Pampady according to one school of thought.

History
Vennimala on the western boundary of Pampady was once the Capital of Thekkumkur. Unnuneeli Sandesam written in 14th century AD describes Vennimala and Thiruvanchiyoor in Thekkumkoor. In AD 1749 King Marthanda Varma of Venadu captured Thekkumkoor and thereafter it was a portion of Travancore. After 1956, Pampady became part of Travancore-Cochin State. The old records, dating back to ME 352 (AD 1176), kept with Kaithamattom Illam in Velloor, throws light on the history of Pampady. There was human inhabitation here about 1000 years back. The Subramanya temple of the Illam was old even at that time. Up to middle of 16th Century, Pampady was under King of Thekkumkoor. Thalikotta was the capital of Thekkumkoor. Pampady was owned by Kothala Madom and later by Ambazhathunkal Kartha. Pampady had three portions-Velloor, Pampady and Thekkan Pampady. Major area of Thekkan Pampady was owned by Kongoor Pallimana and later by Arakkal and Vallatt family. Velloor was owned by Kaithamattom Illam.

Transportation
National highway 183 (earlier known as National Highway 220) passes through the heart of Pampady. It is well connected to Kottayam, Ponkunnam, Kanjirappally, Pallickathode, Puthuppally and Karukachal. Nearby railway stations are Kottayam railway station (16 km) and Changanacherry railway station (22 km). Nearest international airport is Cochin International Airport (90 km)

 Distance from major cities
Thiruvananthapuram 150 kilometres
Ernakulam/Cochin 75 kilometres
Kozhikode 255 kilometres

Big rock

The huge rock in Kattankunnu in Velloor is called "Pampurumpara" – the rock where snakes crawl. According to second school from this, the name Pampady was derived. Another view is that the name was derived from Payampady (area where water is available). This very old temple is on a hill 1500 feet high from sea level. There are a number of small wells and ponds around the temple. In the month of Karkidakam, people conduct Vavubaliritual here. "Vennimal Perumal" Bhaskara Revivarma, the Cheraman Perumal built the temple. Famous sopana musician Shadkala Govinda Marar, contemporary of Swathi Thirunal was born near the temple in Pulikkal house.

Cheruvallikavu
The Cheruvallikavu Devi temple belongs to Kongoor palli mana in the village is now run by the Nair Service Society. Alampally Sreekrishnaswamy temple, Chennampally Gandharvasamy temple are also in Pampady. Sivadharshana Devasom Mahadeva Temple Pampady. St. Mary's Malankara Catholic Church, St. Mary's Simhasana Cathedral, Devamatha Syro Malabar Catholic Church, Holy Immanuel CSI Church, St. John's Cathedral in Pampady, St. Simon's Jacobite Church in Velloor, St. Thomas Orthodox Church, South Pampady, Martha Mariam Jacobite Church Pampady East.

Pampady Dayara
This is a Christian pilgrim centre situated near Pampady. Kuriakos Mar Gregorios (Pampady Thirumeni) was the Metropolitan of Kottayam diocese of Malankara Orthodox Syrian Church during 1929–1965. Under Pampady Dayara, a lot of institutions are functioning including the renowned BMM English Medium HSS.

Education
Schools from Pampady, Kooroppada, Meenadom, Manarcadu and part of Ayarkkunnam panchayat are administered by the Block Resource Centre. There are many high schools and higher secondary schools in Pampady. Such as MGM High School, Sree Bhadra Public School, BMM English Medium HSS, Cross Roads HSS, Vimalambika HSS, Govt HSS Alampally, PTM HSS Velloor,Govt.V.H.S.S Kothala, MGM NSS HSS lakkattoor, St. Thomas HSS South Pampady, Technical High School Velloor and a number of primary schools.

The Rajiv Gandhi Institute of Technology was established in 1991 and is affiliated to the APJ Abdul Kalam Technological University ( KTU ), Thiruvananthapuram, and Kuriakose Gregorios College is affiliated to Mahatma Gandhi University,Kottayam,  Kerala.

Cultural
The Malayalam writer Ponkunnam Varkey hails from this village. 'Navalokam', is an active cultural forum functioning from Pampady. There was the 'Pampady Arts Society' an arts society set up by the art lovers of Pampady. They used to arrange a cultural programme at the Community Hall every month. Deepa Arts Club, Pothenpuram was a very active club during 70's. It was affiliated to the 'Manorama Balajanasakhyam'. They used to participate in the famous 'Balalokam' program of All India Radio. Surabhi Arts Club used to organize All Kerala Native Ball Tournament every year at PTM Govt High School, velloor, pampady.

Health care
The Govt Taluk Hospital is located near Alampally. There are many clinics and ayurvedic dispensaries are also functioning in Pampady.

Government Institutions
Pampady having many other govt and semi government institutions such as Rajiv Gandhi Institute of Technology (Government Engineering College, Kottayam), Police Circle Inspector Office, BSNL exchange, Panchayath office, KSEB Sub-station, etc.

Notable people
Ponkunnam Varkey, writer
Pampady John Joseph, Dalit activist and the founder of the socio-religious movement Cheramar Mahajan Sabha
Thomas Kurian, business manager and CEO of Google Cloud
George Kurian, CEO of NetApp
Baiju N Nair, prominent automotive and travel journalist

References

External links
Official Site of Pampady Dayara

Cities and towns in Kottayam district